A three-decker was a sailing warship which carried her principal carriage-mounted guns on three fully armed decks. Usually additional (smaller) guns were carried on the upper works (forecastle and quarterdeck), but this was not a continuous battery and so did not count as a "fourth deck". Three-deckers were usually "ships of the line", i.e. of sufficient strength to participate in the line of battle, and in the rating system of the Royal Navy were generally classed as first or second rates, although from the mid-1690s until the 1750s the larger of the third rates were also three-deckers.

Three-deckers also served in the naval forces of other European states, notably those of France, Russia and Spain. The French definition of a three-decker differed from that of the English Navy until 1690, as some ships that were officially termed "three-deckers" prior to this date had only a partially-armed third tier of guns, with a significant gap between the guns in the forward portion of that deck and the guns in the aft portion of that deck. In some of these nominal three-deckers this division constituted a structural gap separating the forward and aft sections of this deck, so that these vessels would have been described as "two-deckers" in equivalent English warships.

Respect of a patriotic community
Three-deckers held special respect among the local community and the troops who farewelled these ships when they left the harbour. Such patriotism was expressed when HMS Britannia left Portsmouth bound for active service in the Mediterranean, in October 1840:

See also 
 Two-decker

References

Naval sailing ship types